The 20th Independent Battery, New York Volunteer Artillery was an American Civil War regiment based in New York.

It was mustered into the service of the United States for three years from September until December 1862; on 31 July 1865, it was discharged.

From January 1863 it served at Fort Schuyler under Captain B Franklin Ryer; from July 1864 it served at Fort Columbus.

In total, six enlisted men were lost by death from disease and other causes.

One section of the Battery took part in quelling the New York Draft Riots.

References

See also
List of New York Civil War regiments

Artillery 020
1862 establishments in New York (state)
Artillery units and formations of the American Civil War
Military units and formations established in 1862
Military units and formations disestablished in 1865